{{Infobox television
| alt_name = The New Scooby and Scrappy-Doo Show (1983)The New Scooby-Doo Mysteries (1984)
| image =
| genre = MysteryAdventureComedy
| runtime = 22 minutes
| creator = Joe RubyKen Spears
| developer = Tom Ruegger
| writer = 
| director = Oscar DufauRudy ZamoraGeorge Gordon (Season 1)Carl Urbano (Season 1)John Walker (Season 1)Ray Patterson (supervising director)
| executive_producer = William HannaJoseph Barbera
| producer = Art ScottTom RueggerKay Wright (1984)George Singer (1984)
| voices = Don MessickCasey KasemHeather NorthFrank Welker (1984)Marla Frumkin (1984)
| company = Hanna-Barbera Productions
| distributor = Worldvision Enterprises
| country = United States
| language = English
| network = ABC
| first_aired = 
| last_aired = 
| num_seasons = 2
| num_episodes = 26
| preceded_by = Scooby-Doo and Scrappy-Doo (1980–82)
| followed_by = The 13 Ghosts of Scooby-Doo (1985)
}}The New Scooby and Scrappy-Doo Show is the sixth incarnation of the Saturday morning cartoon Scooby-Doo. It premiered on September 10, 1983, featuring the return of Daphne, and ran for one season on ABC as a half-hour program made up of two eleven-minute short cartoons. In 1984, the name of the show was changed to The New Scooby-Doo Mysteries, with the actual show format remaining the same. However, for season 2, Fred and Velma briefly returned to the show after a four-year absence. The New Scooby-Doo Mysteries ran for another season on ABC.

Thirteen half-hour episodes, composed of twenty-four separate segments were produced under the New Scooby and Scrappy-Doo title in 1983, and thirteen more episodes, composed of twenty separate segments were produced under the name The New Scooby-Doo Mysteries in 1984. At the time, Margaret Loesch, who served as supervising executive for the series, also worked for another animation production company, Marvel Productions.

 Overview 
 Season one 
For this incarnation of the show, Hanna-Barbera attempted to combine elements of both the current format and the newer Scooby-Doo and Scrappy-Doo format. Daphne Blake was added back to the cast after a three-year absence. The plots of each episode feature her, Shaggy Rogers, Scooby-Doo, and Scrappy-Doo solving supernatural mysteries under the cover of being reporters for a teen magazine. Each half-hour program was made up of two 11-minute episodes, which would upon occasion be two parts of one half-hour-long episode.

 Season two 
The second season of this format, broadcast as The New Scooby-Doo Mysteries in 1984, continued the same format, and included six two-part episodes featuring original Scooby-Doo characters Fred Jones and Velma Dinkley, both absent from the series for five years. Fred's last name is given as "Rogers" initially in his return appearance to the series in the episode "Happy Birthday, Scooby-Doo," although later in the same episode it is corrected as "Jones"; Rogers had been established as Shaggy's surname the previous season. The New Scooby-Doo Mysteries theme song is performed in the style of Thriller''-era Michael Jackson. The accompanying opening credits feature shots of a row of monsters dancing like the zombies in Jackson's "Thriller" music video.

Episodes

Season 1 (The New Scooby and Scrappy-Doo Show) (1983)

Season 2 (The New Scooby-Doo Mysteries) (1984)

Voice cast

Main 
 Don Messick – Scooby-Doo, Scrappy-Doo
 Casey Kasem – Shaggy Rogers
 Heather North – Daphne Blake

Recurring 
 Frank Welker – Fred Jones, Additional voices 
 Marla Frumkin – Velma Dinkley

Additional voices 

 Adrienne Alexander
 Jack Angel (Season 1)
 René Auberjonois (Season 2)
 James Avery (Season 2)
 Richard Balin (Season 2)
 Ed Begley, Jr. (Season 1)
 Michael Bell (Season 2)
 Randy Bennett (Season 1)
 Robin Braxton (Season 2)
 Arthur Burghardt
 Ruth Buzzi (Season 2)
 Howard Caine (Season 1)
 Hamilton Camp (Season 2)
 Jody Carlisle (Season 2)
 Louise Chamis (Season 2)
 Phillip Lewis Clarke
 Henry Corden (Season 1)
 Candace Craig (Season 1)
 Peter Cullen (Season 2)
 Brian Cummings (Season 1)
 Dena Deitrich (Season 2)
 Barry Dennen (Season 2)
 Jerry Dexter (Season 1)
 George DiCenzo (Season 2)
 Jeff Doucette
 Walker Edmiston (Season 2)
 Cherie Eichen (Season 1)
 Bernard Erhard (Season 1)
 Al Fann (Season 2)
 Takayo Fischer (Season 2)
 Patrick Fraley (Season 2)
 Joan Gardner (Season 2)
 Linda Gary (Season 2)
 Joan Gerber (Season 2)
 Danny Goldman (Season 2)
 Ernest Harada (Season 1)
 Philip E. Hartman (Season 2)
 Billie Hayes (Season 2)
 Bob Holt (Season 2)
 Joyce Jameson (Season 1)
 S. Marc Jordan (Season 2)
 Jackie Joseph (Season 2)
 Byron Kane (Season 1)
 Phyllis Katz (Season 1)
 Jane Kean (Season 2)
 Zale Kessler (Season 1)
 Tommy Koegnig (Season 2)
 Tom Kratochvil (Season 2)
 Lucy Lee (Season 2)
 Marilyn Lightstone (Season 2)
 Paul Lukather (Season 2)
 Tress MacNeille (Season 2)
 Laurie Main (Season 2)
 Larry Mann (Season 1)
 Kenneth Mars (Season 2)
 Bill Martin (Season 1)
 Mitzi McCall (Season 2)
 Edie McClurg (Season 2)
 Ron McCroby (Season 2)
 Mickie McGowan (Season 1)
 Joe Medalis
 Dianne Michelle (Season 2)
 Michael Mish (Season 1)
 Garrett Morris (Season 2)
 Iona Morris (Season 2)
 John Paragon (Season 1)
 Vic Perrin (Season 1)
 Henry Polic II
 Tony Pope
 Richard Ramos (Season 2)
 Clive Revill (Season 2)
 Allan Rich (Season 2)
 Neilson Ross
 Fran Ryan (Season 2)
 Michael Rye (Season 1)
 Ken Sansom (Season 2)
 Bob Sarlatte (Season 2)
 Marilyn Schreffler
 Marla Scott
 Michael Sheehan (Season 1)
 Hal Smith
 Tony Smyles
 John Stephenson
 Andre Stojka (Season 1)
 Fred Travalena (Season 2)
 Les Tremayne (Season 2)
 Jean Vander Pyl (Season 1)
 Janet Waldo
 B.J. Ward (Season 2)
 Vernee Watson (Season 1)
 Peggy Webber (Season 1)
 Lennie Weinrib (Season 1)
 Jimmy Weldon (Season 1)
 Noni White (Season 1)
 Alan Young (Season 1)
 Marian Zajac (Season 1)

Home media

US releases

International releases

References

External links 
 Official Scooby-Doo website
 
 

1983 American television series debuts
1984 American television series endings
Scooby-Doo television series
1980s American animated television series
1980s American mystery television series
Television series by Hanna-Barbera
English-language television shows
American children's animated adventure television series
American children's animated comedy television series
American children's animated fantasy television series
American children's animated horror television series
American children's animated mystery television series
American Broadcasting Company original programming
Television series created by Tom Ruegger
Television series created by Joe Ruby
Television series created by Ken Spears
American animated television spin-offs